The Walden School is a nonprofit independent Montessori School in Media Pennsylvania. Educating students from Preschool and Kindergarten through Elementary and Middle School.

History
Walden was founded by Mary LeFever in 1967 with a class of 25 Students using leased space in the Springfield Jewish Community Center. LeFever was inspired by fellow educators who encouraged her to learn more about the Montessori philosophy after the 1961 Life Magazine article about the Whitby School. She became intrigued and read many books on the subject, eventually  leading her to spend time at Cambridge Montessori school during the 1965-66 school year. Returning from this experience, she was determined to leave public education and open a Montessori school. With the help of fellow educators Norma and Hal Taussig, she gathered a group of like-minded parents and held the first class on September 18, 1967.

The name "Walden" was derived from a photographic study of Walden Pond conducted by Harry LeFever. The study incorporated quotes from Walden by Henry David Thoreau, which connected with the philosophies of Maria Montessori.

With enrollment increasing to 60 students Walden moved to a new space in the Collenbrook United Church in Drexel Hill in 1970. This also marked the first year of an Elementary program. The elementary school grew to sixth grade by 1975.

By 1983 the school had outgrown its space and moved to a new location on Rutgers Ave. in Swarthmore that it rented from the newly formed Wallingford-Swarthmore School District. Throughout the next decade and a half Walden would move four times within the District, including space in the Strath Haven Middle School and Swarthmore-Rutlidge School.

After 20 years of running the school, Mary LeFever retired in 1987. Cynthia Wein became the head of school.

Permanent home

As part of their 30th anniversary, a capital campaign was begun to raise funds to purchase a permanent campus. In 1998, Walden came to an agreement with the Rose Tree Media School District to purchase the former Sandy Bank School. After extensive renovations, the first classes began in September 1999.

In 2003 it received full accreditation by the Pennsylvania Association of Private Academic Schools today Pennsylvania Association of Independent Schools.

After an assessment of needs, the School embarked on an multi stage building expansion plan in 2006. This plan would have added new classrooms and multi-use spaces. However, the Financial Crisis, with its associated decline in enrollment, forced those plans to be placed on hold. Only the front facade was completed, having already started prior the downturn. The remaining stages are no longer being pursued as the priorities of the School have changed.

Mary McKeon was named as the Head of School in the Summer of 2010.

In 2011, Walden became the nation’s first Fair Trade School for pre-K through 8th grade.

Curriculum
The Walden School's education can be separated into two groups, Preschool and Kindergarten, and the Elementary and Middle School. Throughout the school, teachings and practices are used from the Montessori method. Students are encouraged to find their path to learning using a style and pace best suited to their development.

Preschool and kindergarten
For children starting as young as  years old, Walden offers preschool and kindergarten programs. Programs vary on the length of the school day, full-day or half-day, and frequency, three-day or five-days a week. Regardless of age or program, students will be placed into combined classrooms. Thus older children interact, teach, and learn from their younger peers. The classrooms are prepared with tools and material for all appropriate ages and the teacher acts primarily as a coordinator, encouraging the student to discover their learning pace.

Elementary and middle school
The upper school combines elements of a traditional schooling and Montessori, with a greater shift during the Middle School to prepare students for high school. Each grade is paired with another grade, so that First and Second Graders share a classroom, Third and Fourth Graders share a classroom, 5 & 6 and 7 & 8. This allows for cross education and an opportunity for more self-directed learning. Though it does require lesson plans to be multi-year, so that students do not repeat topics.

Many programs, especially those in arts, music and science, draw on multiple grades. Consequently, students are able to learn throughout their time at Walden and learn from teaching others.

Affiliations
National Association of Independent Schools 
Association of Delaware Valley Independent Schools  
American Montessori Society
Montessori Teachers Association of Pennsylvania

References

External links

Schools in Delaware County, Pennsylvania
Montessori schools in the United States
Private elementary schools in Pennsylvania
Private middle schools in Pennsylvania